Kotappakonda is a holy hill, situated in Palnadu district, Andhra Pradesh, India. It is located 20 kilometers from Narasaraopet city and 62 kilometers south west of Guntur City.

History 
Celebrated with great devotion and fervor every year with a large number of devotees thronging the place, Kotappakonda has an interesting history and some incredible facts associated with it.

 Trikuta Hills: Kotappa Konda hill appears with 3 peaks in any direction so it's also called as Trikutadri, Trikuta Parvatham. The three hills are Brahma hill, Vishnu hill and Rudra hill. These 3 hills can be distinctly seen from a distance from any direction.
 Brahma Shikharam: The main temple Trikoteswara Swamy Temple is located here.
 Rudra Shikharam: Old Kotayya temple is located here. This is the first place where Trikoteswara Swamy existed, seeing the great devotion of Devotee Gollabhama, Trikoteswara Swamy came to Brahma Shikharam. Hence it is called Paatha (old) Kotayya Temple.
 Vishnu Shikharam: Lord Paapanaseswara Temple is here. It is believed that Lord Vishnu did penance for Lord Shiva. There is also a holy pond "Paapanasa Teertha" here.
Sundudu, a cattleman, with his wife Kundiri used to live towards the south of the Trikuta hills. They became rich soon after the birth of their first child, a beautiful daughter, Anandavalli(Gollabhama). Slowly she became a great devotee of Lord Shiva and started spending most of her time offering prayers to Lord Shiva at the Old Koteswara Temple located on Rudra hill. Eventually, she lost all interest in her materialistic life and started penance for Sri Koteswara Swamy.

She used to visit Rudra hill every day, even during the scorching summer, to offer prayers to the Lord. Pleased with her penance, Jangama Devara appeared before her. Sympathized by her penance, Jangama Devara blessed her to be a pregnant, though she was a spinster. Unmindful of her pregnancy she carried her daily prayers as usual. Stupefied at her deep devotion, he again appeared and told her that she need not take so many troubles to perform pujas and offer prayers, and promised her that he himself would come to her house where she could do her penance and commanded her to proceed towards her home, and that he would follow her, but advised her not to look back even once on her way to home, in spite of whatever happens.

From Rudra hill, Anandavalli proceeded towards her home and after reaching Brahma hill, she lost her patience and turned back. The moment she turned back, breaking the promise she made, Lord Jangama Devara immediately stopped where he was, at Brahma hills and entered into a cave on that hill and turned himself into a Lingam. This sacred placed is famous by the name New Koteswara Temple. She then realized that her pregnancy was the creation of him, to test her devotion towards him. She felt happy as she got through all the critical trails and became one in the God.
          
Every Year great festival is held in this Temple, which is known as Tirunallu It is one of the Biggest tirunalla in India The festival takes place on the day of Mahashivaratri. Lakhs of people take part in this festival peoples are came from all over the Telug states. In the festival night Cultural activities also held on the prabha's (prabha is  like a triangle shape arrangement constructed by long tree sticks) prabha's came from several villages near kotappakoda.Prabha's are the main attraction of the festival.

#worldlargesttirunalla #tirunalla

Culture 

Vedas are recognized as the oral heritage by the UNESCO and are taught at Veda Patasala in the village, established by Tirumala Tirupati Devasthanams.

Transport
Kotappakonda town can be reached by bus from Guntur or Narasaraopet or Chilakaluripet.

References

Villages in Guntur district